James Lee Letcavits (December 1, 1935 – February 3, 2015) was a Canadian football player who played for the Edmonton Eskimos and Montreal Alouettes. He played college football at the University of Kansas and also played for the Massillon Tigers. In 2004, he was diagnosed with Alzheimer's disease. He died in 2015.

References

1935 births
2015 deaths
Edmonton Elks players
Sportspeople from Massillon, Ohio
Players of American football from Ohio
Neurological disease deaths in Ohio
Deaths from Alzheimer's disease
American football wide receivers
Canadian football wide receivers
Kansas Jayhawks football players
Montreal Alouettes players
American players of Canadian football